The yellow-bellied dacnis (Dacnis flaviventer) is a species of bird in the family Thraupidae, the Tanagers. It is found in Amazonian regions of Colombia, Ecuador, Peru, Bolivia and Brazil; also the eastern Orinoco River region of Venezuela. Its natural habitat is the canopy of tropical humid lowland forest.

The yellow-bellied dacnis is mostly an Amazon Basin bird, except being absent in the northeast with the Guianas. A range extension from the contiguous range extends into central Bolivia. In Venezuela, besides the Amazonian drainages, the species is also in the eastern regions of the Orinoco River drainage and the headwaters.

References

Further reading

External links
Yellow-bellied Dacnis videos on the Internet Bird Collection
Yellow-bellied Dacnis photo gallery VIREO Photo-High Res
Photo-Super High Res-(Click on Picture); Article

yellow-bellied dacnis
Birds of the Amazon Basin
yellow-bellied dacnis
Taxonomy articles created by Polbot
Taxa named by Frédéric de Lafresnaye
Taxa named by Alcide d'Orbigny